Ondine is a variation of undine, the category of elemental beings associated with water

Ondine may also refer to:

Literature
 Ondine (novel), a novel by Shannon Drake (1988)
 Ondine (play), a play by Jean Giraudoux (1938)
 Ondine, a poem by Aloysius Bertrand (1842)
 Ondine, a character in Toni Morrison's novel Tar Baby (1981)

Art
 Ondine, a painting by John William Waterhouse  (1849–1917)
 Ondine, a painting by David Wightman (2017/18)

Music and ballet
 Ondine, a movement of the piano piece Gaspard de la nuit by Maurice Ravel (1906)
 Ondine, ou La naïade, a ballet with music by Cesare Pugni and choreography by Jules Perrot, first produced in 1843
 Ondine (ballet), a ballet with music by Hans Werner Henze and choreography by Frederick Ashton, first produced in 1958 for the Royal Ballet
 Ondine, a prelude for piano by Debussy (1912)
 "Ondine", a song by They Might Be Giants, from the EP Back to Skull
 "Ondine", a song by Echobelly, from the album People Are Expensive
 Ondine (record label), a classical record label
 Ondine, a song by Lower Dens from their 2015's album Escape from Evil

Film
 Ondine (film), a 2009 film by Irish film maker Neil Jordan
 The Loves of Ondine, a film by Andy Warhol

Other uses
 Ondine (actor), also known as Robert Olivo (1937–1989), American actor
 Ondine Achampong, British artistic gymnast
 Ondine, a typeface (font) designed by Adrian Frutiger

See also
 Undine (disambiguation)
 Ondine's curse, a medical condition